Ippolito Pindemonte (November 13, 1753 – November 18, 1828) was an Italian poet.  He was educated at the Collegio di San Carlo in Modena, but otherwise spent most of his life in Verona.

He was born into an aristocratic family, and travelled a great deal in his youth. He was a close friend of the mathematician and translator Giuseppe Torelli (1721–1781) and the scholar Girolamo Pompei. His brother Giovanni Pindemonte was a prominent dramatist.

He witnessed and was deeply affected by the French Revolution, residing in Paris for ten months during 1789. He later spent time in England and Austria.  A Romantic poet, he was principally influenced by Ugo Foscolo and Thomas Gray, and was associated with the Della Cruscans.  He devoted much of his life to a translation of the Odyssey, which was published in 1822.

Works

Pindemonte and Villa Mosconi Bertani
Ippolito Pindemonte has been resident for many years in Villa Mosconi Bertani where he was involved in the design of the romantic park.

External links

1753 births
1828 deaths
Italian poets
Italian male poets
Italian translators
Writers from Verona